Khara-Shibir (Khara Sheber) is a rural locality (an ulus) in Zaigrayevsky District, Republic of Buryatia, Russia. The population was 175 as of 2010. There is 1 street.

Geography 
Khara-Shibir is located 36 km northeast of Zaigrayevo (the district's administrative centre) by road. Pervomayevka is the nearest rural locality.

References 

Rural localities in Zaigrayevsky District